Richard Lawson (born 14 February 1986) is a British speedway rider.

Career
He was born in Whitehaven, Cumbria. After a successful junior career in motocross, which included winning the British 125cc championship in 2003, he rode professionally for Kawasaki before taking up speedway in June 2008. He made his competitive debut in the Conference League for Redcar Cubs before signing to ride for Workington Comets in the Premier League in 2009. He stayed with the Comets in 2010 and also signed for Elite League Wolverhampton Wolves as their number 8. He remained with the Comets until the end of the 2013 season, and gained further Elite League experience in 2012 with Peterborough Panthers and in 2013 with Lakeside Hammers. He signed to ride again for the Hammers in 2014 and opted not to re-sign for the Comets.

In 2015, Lawson moved to Glasgow Tigers in the Premier League, staying with Lakeside in the Elite League. He finished fourth in the averages during the 2015 Premier League speedway season and would spend three seasons in Scotland from 2015 to 2017, winning the Knockout Cup for his club in 2016. He also rode for the Somerset Rebels from 2017 to 2018, winning the division 1 Knockout Cup during the SGB Premiership 2018. In 2019, he joined the Ipswich Witches and Eastbourne Eagles in division 1 and 2 respectively and had his 2020 season with Sheffield curtailed due to the COVID-19 pandemic.

In 2022, he rode for the King's Lynn Stars in the SGB Premiership 2022 and for the Poole Pirates in the SGB Championship 2022. As part of the Poole team he helped them retain their tier 2 league and KO Cup double crown.

In 2023, he signed for Leicester Lions for the SGB Premiership 2023 and re-signed for Poole for the SGB Championship 2023.

References

Living people
1986 births
English motorcycle racers
British speedway riders
Sportspeople from Whitehaven
Eastbourne Eagles riders
Glasgow Tigers riders
Ipswich Witches riders
King's Lynn Stars riders
Lakeside Hammers riders
Leicester Lions riders
Peterborough Panthers riders
Plymouth Gladiators speedway riders
Poole Pirates riders
Somerset Rebels riders
Workington Comets riders
Wolverhampton Wolves riders